A wart  is a small, rough growth resembling a cauliflower or a solid blister.

Wart may also refer to:

Arts, entertainment, and media
 Wart (character), a fictional frog in Nintendo games
 Wart, the principal character in T. H. White's 1938 novel The Sword in the Stone
 Molester's Train: The Wart, a 1996 Japanese pink film
 WART-LP, a low-power radio station (95.5 FM) licensed to serve Marshall, North Carolina, United States

Other uses
 Azariah Wart (1822–1900), New York assemblyman
 Wart Castle,  a Swiss heritage site

See also
 Freek van der Wart (born 1988), Dutch short track speed skater
 Henry van Wart (1784–1873),  American who became British by special act of Parliament, founded the Birmingham Stock Exchange, and served as one of Birmingham's first aldermen
 Isaac Van Wart (1762–1828), American militiaman in the Revolutionary War, one of the three men who captured British Major John André